Tarmo Soomere (born 11 October 1957 in Tallinn) is an Estonian marine scientist and mathematician. Since 2014, he is the president of Estonian Academy of Sciences. In March 2021 Soomere announced his candidacy for the 2021 Estonian presidential election.

Awards
2002 Estonian National Research Award (for engineering sciences)
2005 People of the Year (for newspaper Postimees)
2007 Baltic Assembly Prize for Literature, the Arts and Science

References

1957 births
Living people
Estonian scientists
Estonian mathematicians
People from Tallinn
University of Tartu alumni
Recipients of the Order of the White Star, 3rd Class